AVP
Aarakshan Virodhi Party (आरक्षण विरोधी पार्टी) is an Indian political party registered by the Election Commission of India before the 2014 Indian general election.

Electoral candidacy

References 

Political parties in Haryana
Political parties in Rajasthan
Political parties in Chhattisgarh
Political parties in Delhi
Reservation in India
2014 establishments in India
Political parties established in 2014